The Second cabinet of Steingrímur Hermannsson in Iceland was formed 28 September 1988.

Cabinet

Inaugural cabinet: 28 September 1988 – 10 September 1989

See also
Government of Iceland
Cabinet of Iceland

References

Steingrimur Hermannsson, Second cabinet of
Steingrimur Hermannsson, Second cabinet of
Steingrimur Hermannsson, Second cabinet of
Cabinets established in 1988
Cabinets disestablished in 1989
Progressive Party (Iceland)